Zaid Abner Romero (born 15 December 1999) is an Argentine professional footballer who plays as a centre-back for LDU Quito, on loan from Godoy Cruz.

Club career
Romero made his professional debut with Godoy Cruz in a 2-0 Argentine Primera División loss to Defensa y Justicia on 8 December 2019.

At the end of February 2021, Romero was sent out on loan to Primera Nacional club Villa Dálmine for the rest of the year. He left the club and returned to Godoy Cruz at the end of 2021, with a total of 25 appearances for the club. In January 2022, Romero was once again sent out on loan, this time to Ecuadorian Serie A side LDU Quito until the end of 2022 with a purchase option. The deal was confirmed on 20 December 2021.

References

External links

1999 births
Living people
Sportspeople from Mendoza, Argentina
Argentine footballers
Argentine expatriate footballers
Association football defenders
Argentine Primera División players
Primera Nacional players
Ecuadorian Serie A players
Godoy Cruz Antonio Tomba footballers
Villa Dálmine footballers
L.D.U. Quito footballers
Argentine expatriate sportspeople in Ecuador
Expatriate footballers in Ecuador